Paul Marchioni (born January 1, 1955 in Corte, Haute-Corse) is a French former professional football defender.

He was part of SC Bastia team that reached 1978 UEFA Cup Final.

External links
 
 Profile

1955 births
Living people
People from Corte, Haute-Corse
French footballers
Association football defenders
SC Bastia players
OGC Nice players
Ligue 1 players
Ligue 2 players
Mediterranean Games silver medalists for France
Footballers from Corsica
Mediterranean Games medalists in football
Competitors at the 1975 Mediterranean Games
INF Vichy players
Sportspeople from Haute-Corse